The Mask of Sorrow (Maska skorbi) is a monument located on a hill above Magadan, Russia, commemorating the many prisoners who suffered and died in the Gulag prison camps in the Kolyma region of the Soviet Union during the 1930s, 1940s, and 1950s.

It consists of a large concrete statue of a face, with tears coming from the left eye in the form of small masks. The right eye is in the form of a barred window. The back side portrays a weeping young woman and a man on a cross with his head hanging backwards. Inside is a replication of a typical Stalin-era prison cell. Below the Mask of Sorrow are stone markers bearing the names of many of the forced-labor camps of the Kolyma, as well as others designating the various religions and political systems of those who suffered there.

The statue was unveiled on June 12, 1996 with the help of the Russian government and financial contributions from seven Russian cities, including Magadan. The design was created by the sculptor Ernst Neizvestny, whose parents fell victim to the Stalinist purges of the 1930s; the monument was constructed by Kamil Kazaev. It is 15 metres high and takes up 56 cubic metres of space.

Gallery

See also
Sevvostlag
Butugychag
Serpantinka

References 

1996 sculptures
Buildings and structures in Magadan Oblast
Magadan
Memorials to victims of communism
Monuments and memorials in Russia
Cultural heritage monuments in Magadan Oblast
Objects of cultural heritage of Russia of regional significance